Sam Phillips (1923–2003) was an American record producer and founder of Sun Records.

Sam Phillips may also refer to:

 Sam Phillips (musician) (born 1962), American female singer-songwriter who also recorded using the name "Leslie Phillips"
 Sam Phillips (model) (born 1966), American glamour model and disc jockey
 Sam Phillips, a fictional character in the British TV series, Moving Wallpaper
 Sam Phillips (actor) (born 1984), English actor and writer
Sam Phillips (badminton) in 2013 London Grand Prix Gold
Sam Phillips (sailor), Australian sailor

See also
 Samuel Phillips (disambiguation)